pCloudy is a mobile application testing platform on cloud for "next-gen" app testing.

It was founded in 2013. It was Acquired by Smart Software Testing Solutions Inc., a Dublin, California based company. It provides mobile testing tools, automation testing tools and bot testing on real devices.

References

2016 establishments in California
Applications of artificial intelligence
Software companies based in California